Tomorrow My Love is a 1971 Danish drama film directed by Finn Karlsson and starring Lykke Nielsen.

Cast
 Lykke Nielsen - Isabel
 Kirsten Peüliche - Marca
 Morten Grunwald - David
 Jesper Langberg - Michael
 Pernille Grumme - Gerd
 Erni Arneson - Isabels mor
 Preben Mahrt - Isabels far
 Poul Petersen - Marcas far
 Bo Bonfils - Gustav
 Helge Scheuer - Boghandler
 Erik Dibbern - Kunde i boghandel
 Niels Andersen - Løjtnant
 Pernille Skov - Pige på vaskeri
 Erik Larsen - Portner
 Esben Høilund Carlsen - Scenograf
 Knud Larsen - Scenearbejder
 Poul Reichhardt - Skuespiller

External links

1971 films
1970s Danish-language films
1971 drama films
Danish drama films